Dobriceni may refer to several villages in Romania:

 Dobriceni, a village in Iancu Jianu Commune, Olt County
 Dobriceni, a village in Stoeneşti Commune, Vâlcea County